Joshua Township is one of twenty-six townships in Fulton County, Illinois, USA.  As of the 2010 census, its population was 510 and it contained 206 housing units.

Geography

Unincorporated towns

 Fiatt
(This list is based on USGS data and may include former settlements.)
 Bybee
 Sugarville

Cemeteries
The township contains these cemeteries:  Bybee, Fiatt, Gardiner, Locust Lane and Moore.

Major highways
  Illinois Route 9
  Illinois Route 97

Demographics

School districts
 Canton Union School District 66
 Community Unit School District 3 Fulton City
 Spoon River Valley Community Unit School District 4

Political districts
 Illinois' 17th congressional district
 State House District 91
 State Senate District 46

References
 
 United States Census Bureau 2007 TIGER/Line Shapefiles
 United States National Atlas

External links
 City-Data.com
 Illinois State Archives

Townships in Fulton County, Illinois
Townships in Illinois